Mark Matthews (born 1987) is a professional mountain biker.

Biography
Mathews was born in 1987 in Victoria, British Columbia. He completed his high school education in 2005 graduating from parkland secondary in north saanich BC..

At the age of 14, with guidance and on going support from his dad he started writing to the local municipality and advocated, for dirt jumps in his community of north Saanich. Where mark had to do most of the fund raising and promotion himself with limited support from the local community.

After graduating highschool mark traveled around Australia for 6 months. When he returned back to canada he attended Camosun college and earned his B.A  in sports managment.

In the early 2010s, he participated in a notable series including Barred for Life and Alchemy in British Columbia along with mountain riders including Jordie Lunn.

In 2018, he published his directed work, A Hard Tale.

In 2020, he directed Changing Seasons with Scott Bell. His other notable work include In the Moment and Hometown.

Mark now resides in  the comox valley BC. With his wife chelsey, 2 stepdaughters and 2 cats.

See also 
 List of professional mountain bikers

References

1987 births
Living people
Canadian mountain bikers